The 1983 Central Michigan Chippewas football team represented Central Michigan University in the Mid-American Conference (MAC) during the 1983 NCAA Division I-A football season. In their sixth season under head coach Herb Deromedi, the Chippewas compiled an 8–3 record (7–2 against MAC opponents), finished in a three-way tie for second place in the MAC standings, and outscored their opponents, 257 to 136. The team played its home games in Kelly/Shorts Stadium in Mount Pleasant, Michigan, with attendance of 115,635 in five home games.

The team's statistical leaders included quarterback Ron Fillmore with 915 passing yards, tailback Curtis Adams with 1,431 rushing yards, and split end John DeBoer with 540 receiving yards. Offensive guard Chris McKay received the team's most valuable player award. Six Central Michigan players (Adams, McKay, linebacker Kevin Egnatuk, defensive tackle Pat Brackett, defensive tackle Mike Mills, and defensive back Jim Bowman) received first-team All-MAC honors.

Schedule

References

Central Michigan
Central Michigan Chippewas football seasons
Central Michigan Chippewas football